Murichorda jacobsoni is a species of sea snail, a marine gastropod mollusk in the family Muricidae, the murex snails or rock snails.

Description

Distribution
Philippines.

References

 Emerson W.K. & D'Attilio A. (1981) Remarks on Muricodrupa Iredale, 1918 (Muricidae: Thaidinae), with the description of a new species. The Nautilus 95(2): 77-82
 Houart, R.: Zuccon, D. & Puillandre, N. (2019). Description of new genera and new species of Ergalataxinae (Gastropoda: Muricidae). Novapex. 20 (Hors série 12): 1-52.

Murichorda
Gastropods described in 1981